Dazhimen or Ta-chih-men railway station in Wuhan, China, was the southern terminus of the Beijing–Hankou railway. It is located at the intersection of Jinghan Road and Chezhan Road in Jiang'an District, part of the former city of Hankou. In 2001 it was named a Major National Historical and Cultural Site.

The station building is a brick-and-wood structure of two floors, designed by French architects in a German medieval style. It has an area of 4,000 square meters, with the waiting room occupying 1,022 square meters. The whole building is symmetrical, divided crossways into five sections. There are four 20-meter-high towers at the corners of the central section.

References

Major National Historical and Cultural Sites in Hubei
Railway stations in Wuhan
Railway stations in China opened in 1903
Railway stations closed in 1991